The Odyssey is an ancient Greek epic poem attributed to Homer.

Odyssey or The Odyssey may also refer to:

Business and industry
 Odyssey BMX, a BMX bicycle parts company
 Odyssey Healthcare, a hospice company
 Odyssey International, a Canadian airline
 Odyssey Marine Exploration, an American underwater salvage company
 Odyssey Productions, an American photography and 3-D computer animation company
 Odyssey Space Research, a business in Houston, Texas, U.S.
 Honda Odyssey, one of several types of a vehicle
 Honda Odyssey (international), a minivan sold in Japan and other parts of the world
 Honda Odyssey (North America), a minivan sold primarily in the United States and Canada
 Honda Odyssey (ATV), an all-terrain vehicle
 Odyssey (bookstore), a chain of bookstores in India
 Odyssey (tanker), an oil tanker responsible for an oil spill off the coast of Nova Scotia
 Windows Odyssey, an unreleased version of the Microsoft Windows operating system that was combined with Windows Neptune to form Windows XP
 Cybook Odyssey, an eBook reader by the French company Bookeen
 Odyssey Golf, a manufacturer of golf putters, acquired by Callaway Golf Company
 Odyssey case management software for law courts from Tyler Technologies

Science and technology
 2001 Mars Odyssey, an American spacecraft orbiting the planet Mars
 Neptune Odyssey, a mission concept for an orbiter to Neptune
 Odyssey, callsign of the Command Module for the Apollo 13 space mission
 Odyssey (launch platform), a self-propelled semi-submersible mobile spacecraft launch platform converted from a mobile drilling rig in 1997
Odysee, a blockchain-based decentralised video sharing platform, operated by LBRY

Places and education
Odyssey Complex, a sports and entertainment complex in Belfast, Northern Ireland.
Odyssey Cinema, St Albans, a restored cinema in the UK

Schools
 Odyssey Academy, a high/middle school in Greece, New York, U.S.
 Odyssey School, a private middle school in San Mateo, California, U.S.
 Odyssey – The Essential School, a high school in SeaTac, Washington, U.S.
 École L'Odyssée, a public high school in Moncton, New Brunswick, Canada
 École publique l'Odyssée, a public high school in North Bay, Ontario, Canada

Educational program
 Odyssey (education), a Canadian government bursary for language education

Literature
 Odyssey Award, an annual award for best children's or young adult audiobook
 Odyssey Writing Workshop, an annual fantasy-writing workshop at Saint Anselm College in New Hampshire, U.S.

Books
 Odyssey (novel), a 2007 novel by Jack McDevitt
 "Odyssey" (Ulysses part), the middle part of James Joyce's novel Ulysses
 Odyssey: Pepsi to Apple, a book by former Apple Inc. CEO John Sculley
 The Odyssey: A Modern Sequel, an epic poem by Nikos Kazantzakis
 Isaac Asimov's Robot City: Odyssey, a novel by Michael P. Kube-McDowell

Periodicals
 Odyssey (children's magazine), a science magazine for children ages 9–14
 Odyssey (publication), an online social content platform styled like a news publication
 Odyssey Magazine (South Africa), a health and lifestyle magazine

Music
 Odyssey (band), an American dance band (1968–1987)
 ARP Odyssey, an electronic music synthesizer
 The Odyssey (Smith), a symphony for concert band by Robert W. Smith

Albums
 Odyssey (Barry Guy, Marilyn Crispell, and Paul Lytton album), 2001
 Odyssey (Fischerspooner album), 2005
 Odyssey (Hayley Westenra album), 2005
 Odyssey (James Blood Ulmer album) or the title song, 1984
 Odyssey (Ketil Bjørnstad album) or the title song, 1990
 Odyssey (Miles Davis album) or Quintet/Sextet, 1956
 Odyssey (Take That album), 2018
 Odyssey (Terje Rypdal album), 1975
 Odyssey (Yngwie J. Malmsteen album), 1988
 Odyssey: The Definitive Collection, by Vangelis, 2003
 Odyssey: The Remix Collection, by Delerium, 2001
 The Odyssey (album) or the title song (see below), by Symphony X, 2002
 Odyssey, by Damo Suzuki, 2000
 The Odyssey, by David Bedford, 1976

Songs
 "The Odyssey" (song), by Symphony X from the album The Odyssey
 "Odyssey", by Dixie Dregs from What If
 "Odyssey", by Johnny Harris
 "Odyssey", by Kiss from Music from "The Elder"
 "Odyssey", by Kyuss from Welcome to Sky Valley
 "Odyssey", by Scale the Summit from The Migration
 "The Odyssey", by Incubus from Halo 2 Original Soundtrack
 "The Odyssey", by Orgy from the album Vapor Transmission
 "Odyssey", by Kaleida

Television

Channels
 Odyssey Television Network, a Canadian Greek-language broadcasting company
 Odyssey (TV channel), a Greek-language cable channel operated by the network
 Odyssey Channel, a defunct Australian television channel
 Odyssey Network, a U.S. television network that later became the Hallmark Channel

Series, episodes and other productions
 The Odyssey (1968 miniseries), a 1968 Italian-French-German-Yugoslavian miniseries
 The Odyssey (TV series), a 1992-1995 Canadian series
 The Odyssey (1997 miniseries), a 1997 American miniseries
 Odyssey (TV series), a 2015 NBC series
 Odyssey 5, a 2002 Canadian series
 Odyssey: Driving Around the World, an American documentary series
 Star Trek: Odyssey, a Star Trek fan production
 "Odyssey", a three-part episode of Lassie (1961)
 "Odyssey", an episode of Smallville
 "Homer's Odyssey" (The Simpsons), the third full length episode of The Simpsons
 "The Odyssey" (Arrow), an episode of Arrow
 Lonely Planet: Odyssey, alternate title for the series Graham's World with Graham Hughes, documenting travelling around the world without flying

Fictional spacecraft
 Odyssey, a battlecruiser in the Stargate universe
 Odyssey, a spaceship in the anime series Ulysses 31

Gaming
 Odyssey series, series of home video game consoles
 Magnavox Odyssey, the first commercial home video game console
 Magnavox Odyssey 2, second generation home video game console
Odyssey, an expansion to the Elite Dangerous game by Frontier
 Odyssey (Magic: The Gathering), a card game expansion
 Odyssey: The Compleat Apventure, an Apple II role-playing video game
 Odyssey: The Search for Ulysses, a 2000 video game
 Odyssey LRP, a live roleplay game run by Profound Decisions
 Odyssey Engine, a computer game engine
 Odyssey Software, an American computer-game developer
 Odyssey: The Legend of Nemesis, a Macintosh role-playing video game based on the engine of Minotaur: The Labyrinths of Crete
 Odyssey, a virtual world based on the 2010 Summer Youth Olympics
 Super Mario Odyssey, a platformer released in 2017
Assassin's Creed Odyssey, an action-roleplaying game set in Ancient Greece

Other arts and entertainment

Radio
 Audacy, an American broadcasting company formerly known as Entercom and pronounced the same as 'odyssey'
 Odyssey (WBEZ), a radio talk show in Chicago, U.S.
 Adventures in Odyssey or Odyssey, an Evangelical Christian-themed children's radio series

Film
 The Odyssey, a 1987 animated film produced by Burbank Films Australia
 The Odyssey (film), a 2016 French-Belgian film

Painting
 The Odyssey (painting), an 1850 painting by Jean Auguste Dominique Ingres

People
 Odyssey Sims (born 1992), American basketball player
 Odicci Alexander (born 1998), American softball player

See also
 Odysseus (disambiguation)
 Ulysses (disambiguation)